Sanjay Mishra may refer to:

 Sanjay Mishra (musician), American guitarist of Indian descent
 Sanjay Mishra (actor) (born 1962), Indian film actor